Established in 1872 in Philadelphia, the Association for Public Art (formerly Fairmount Park Art Association) is the United States' first private, nonprofit public art organization dedicated to integrating public art and urban planning. The Association for Public Art (aPA) commissions, preserves, promotes and interprets public art in Philadelphia, and it is largely due to the work of the aPA that Philadelphia has one of the largest public art collections in the country. The aPA has acquired and commissioned works by many famous sculptors (including Augustus Saint-Gaudens, Alexander Stirling Calder, Daniel Chester French, Frederic Remington, Paul Manship, and Albert Laessle); supported city planning projects; established an outdoor sculpture conservation program; and sponsored numerous publications, exhibitions, and educational programs. The aPA interprets and preserves more than 200 works of art throughout Philadelphia – working closely with the city's Public Art Office, Fairmount Park, and other organizations and agencies responsible for placing and caring for outdoor sculpture in Philadelphia – and maintains an inventory of all of the city's public art.

History

Chartered by the Commonwealth of Pennsylvania in 1872, the Fairmount Park Art Association (now the Association for Public Art) was founded by a group of concerned citizens in the late nineteenth century who wanted to beautify Philadelphia's urban landscape with public art to counter the city's encroaching industrialism. The Association initially focused on enhancing Fairmount Park with outdoor sculpture, but the organization's mission expanded in 1906 to include the rest of the city as a whole: to "promote and foster the beautiful in Philadelphia, in its architecture, improvements, and the city plan." Friends Charles H. Howell and Henry K. Fox conceived of the Fairmount Park Art Association, and the organization's first president was Anthony J. Drexel, founder of Drexel University. The Association's first official venture was purchasing Hudson Bay Wolves Quarreling Over the Carcass of a Deer (1872) by Edward Kemeys, and its first major undertaking was commissioning Alexander Milne Calder for an equestrian statue of Major General George Meade in 1873.

Name change
In May 2012, the Fairmount Park Art Association changed its name to the Association for Public Art (aPA). The change was made to more clearly communicate the nature and scope of the organization's work, and to distinguish itself from other local and national public art agencies. The organization's first major project under its new name was Open Air (2012), a world-premiere interactive light installation for the Benjamin Franklin Parkway by Rafael Lozano-Hemmer.

Public Artworks (overview)

 Maja (1942, reinstalled 2021), Gerhard Marcks, purchased by the Association for Public Art Winter Fountains (2017), Jennifer Steinkamp, presented by the Parkway Council and commissioned by the Association for Public Art 
 Cai Guo-Qiang: Fireflies (2017), Cai Guo-Qiang, commissioned by the Association for Public Art with Fung Collaboratives 
 Big Bling (2016; installed 2017), Martin Puryear, presented by the Association for Public Art, commissioned by Madison Square Park Conservancy 
 AMOR (1998; installed 2015), Robert Indiana, presented by the Association for Public Art and the Philadelphia Museum of Art 
 Magic Carpet (2014), Candy Coated (formerly Candy Depew), commissioned by the Association for Public Art 
 Symbiosis (2011; installed 2014), Roxy Paine, acquired through a grant from the Daniel W. Dietrich II Trust, Inc.
 OPEN AIR (2012), Rafael Lozano-Hemmer, commissioned by the Association for Public Art 
 Rock Form (Porthcurno) (1964; installed 2012), Barbara Hepworth, gift of David N. Pincus to the Association for Public Art, commissioned by the Philadelphia Redevelopment Authority 
 The Labor Monument: Philadelphia's Tribute to the American Worker (2010), John Kindness, commissioned by the Association for Public Art  
 Common Ground (2009), John Stone and Lonnie Graham in collaboration with Lorene Cary for Project HOME, commissioned by the Association for Public Art  
 Iroquois (1983–1999; installed 2007), Mark di Suvero, acquired by the Association for Public Art, gift of David N. Pincus   
 Manayunk Stoops: Heart and Home (2006), Diane Pieri, commissioned by the Association for Public Art  
 Embodying Thoreau: Dwelling, Sitting, Watching (2003), Ed Levine, commissioned by the Association for Public Art  
 I have a story to tell you…(2003), Pepón Osorio, commissioned by the Association for Public Art 
 Pavilion in the Trees (1993), Martin Puryear, commissioned by the Association for Public Art  
 Sleeping Woman (1991), Tom Chimes and Stephen Berg, commissioned by the Association for Public Art 
 Fingerspan (1987), Jody Pinto, commissioned by the Association for Public Art 
 Bolt of Lightning...A Memorial to Benjamin Franklin (conceived 1933; installed 1984), Isamu Noguchi, commissioned by the Association for Public Art
 Louis Kahn Lecture Room (1982), Siah Armajani, commissioned by the Association for Public Art  
 El Gran Teatro de la Luna (1982), Rafael Ferrer, commissioned by the Association for Public Art 
 Atmosphere and Environment XII (1970), Louise Nevelson, purchased by the Association for Public Art 
 The Wedges (1970), Robert Morris, acquired by the Association for Public Art, gift of Mr. and Mrs. H. Gates Lloyd 
 Tiger at Bay (1965), Albino Manca, purchased by the Association for Public Art 
 Three Way Piece Number 1: Points (1964), Henry Moore, purchased by the Association for Public Art 
 Cow Elephant and Calf (1962), Heinz Warneke, commissioned by the Association for Public Art  
 Bear and Cub (1957), Joseph J. Greenberg Jr., commissioned by the Association for Public Art 
 The Spirit of Enterprise (1950–1960), Jacques Lipchitz, commissioned by the Association for Public Art 
 Aero Memorial (1948), Paul Manship, commissioned by the Association for Public Art and Aero Club of Pennsylvania  
 The Ellen Phillips Samuel Memorial (1933-1961), various artists, commissioned by the Association for Public Art 
 The Mounted Amazon Attacked by a Panther (1839, cast 1929), August Kiss, commissioned by the Association for Public Art 
 Shakespeare Memorial (1926), Alexander Stirling Calder, commissioned by the Association for Public Art, City of Philadelphia, and the Shakespeare Memorial Committee 
 Thorfinn Karlsefni (1918), Einar Jónsson, commissioned by the Association for Public Art and J. Bunford Samuel 
 Billy (1914), Albert Laessle, gift of Eli Kirke Price II to the Association for Public Art 
 Duck Girl (1911), Paul Manship, purchased by the Association for Public Art 
 Cowboy (1908), Frederic Remington, commissioned by the Association for Public Art 
 The Medicine Man (1899), Cyrus E. Dallin, commissioned by the Association for Public Art 
 General Ulysses S. Grant (1897), Daniel Chester French and Edward C. Potter, commissioned by the Association for Public Art 
 James A. Garfield Monument (1895), Augustus Saint-Gaudens, commissioned by the Association for Public Art 
 The Lion Fighter (1858, cast 1892), Albert Wolff, commissioned by the Association for Public Art 
 Lion Crushing a Serpent 1832, cast 1891), Antoine-Louis Barye, purchased by the Association for Public Art 
 Dickens and Little Nell (1890), Frank Edwin Elwell, purchased by the Association for Public Art 
 Stone Age in America (1887) by John J. Boyle, commissioned by the Association for Public Art 
 Major General George Gordon Meade (1887), Alexander Milne Calder, commissioned by the Association for Public Art 
 The Dying Lioness (1873), Wilhelm Franz Alexander Friedrich Wolff, commissioned by the Association for Public Art 
 Night (1872), Edward Stauch, purchased by the Association for Public Art 
 Hudson Bay Wolves Quarreling Over the Carcass of a Deer (1872), Edward Kemeys, purchased by the Association for Public Art

Publications

 New Land Marks: public art, community, and the meaning of place, 2001
 Public Art in Philadelphia, 1992
 Form and Function: Proposals for Public Art for Philadelphia, 1982
 Sculpture of a City: Philadelphia's Treasures in Bronze and Stone, 1974

Awards and recognition

 Wyck-Strickland Award for aPA Executive Director Penny Balkin Bach, 2019
Public Art Network Award, Americans for the Arts, 2015
 Best of Philly ® 2014 – New Public Artwork for Roxy Paine's Symbiosis, 2014 
 Inaugural Tyler Tribute Award for aPA Executive Director Penny Balkin Bach, 2013 
 PAD award for achievement in the field of public art for aPA Executive Director Penny Balkin Bach, 2013
 AASLH Award of Merit, American Association for State and Local History, 2011 
 PNC Arts Alive Award for Arts Innovation in Honor of Peggy Amsterdam, Arts and Business Council of Greater Philadelphia, 2011
 Named one of "10 great sculpture gardens across the USA," USA Today, 2011 
 aPA public art projects I have a story to tell you... and Embodying Thoreau: dwelling, sitting, watching named among "the country's best," Year in Review, Americans for the Arts, 2004 
 EDRA/Places Award for Place Planning, Environmental Design Research Association (EDRA) and the publication Places, A Forum of Environmental Design, 2002
 Henry J. Magaziner EFAIA Award, the AIA Philadelphia Historic Preservation Committee, 2002
 Award for Outstanding Commitment to the Preservation and Care of Collections, The American Institute for Conservation of Historic and Artistic Works and Heritage Preservation, 2000
 First-place SOS! Achievement Award, Save Outdoor Sculpture! (SOS!), 1999
 The Herbert Adams Memorial Medal for outstanding service to American sculpture, National Sculpture Society, 1979
 Centennial Award of Honor from The Philadelphia Chapter of American Institute of Architects, 1969

See also

List of public art in Philadelphia

References

External links
 Association for Public Art
 Museum Without Walls: AUDIO

Arts organizations based in Pennsylvania
Organizations based in Philadelphia
Public art in the United States
Outdoor sculptures in Philadelphia
1872 establishments in Pennsylvania
Non-profit organizations based in Pennsylvania
Arts organizations established in 1872